The 1969 International cricket season was from May 1969 to August 1969.

Season overview

June

West Indies in England

July

West Indies in England

References

1969 in cricket